The 1997 European Youth Summer Olympic Days was the fourth edition of multi-sport event for European youths between the ages of 12 and 18. It was held in Lisbon, Portugal from 18 to 24 July. A total of ten sports were contested.

Sports

Medal table

References

Bell, Daniel (2003). Encyclopedia of International Games. McFarland and Company, Inc. Publishers, Jefferson, North Carolina. .
Medal table
Tableau des médailles Lisbonne - Portugal (1997). French Olympic Committee. Retrieved on 2014-11-23.

 
1997
European Youth Summer Olympic Days
European Youth Summer Olympic Days
European Youth Summer Olympic Days
Multi-sport events in Portugal
Sports competitions in Lisbon
1990s in Lisbon
Youth sport in Portugal
July 1997 sports events in Europe